Edebessa is a genus of moths in the family Megalopygidae erected by Francis Walker in 1856.

Species
Edebessa bicolor (Möschler, 1883)
Edebessa placida (E. D. Jones, 1912)
Edebessa purens (Walker, 1855)

Former species
Edebessa circumcincta (Schaus, 1905)
Edebessa nigrorufa (Walker, 1865)

References

Megalopygidae
Megalopygidae genera